Hal Shockey was a Canadian outdoorsman. He spent most of his adult life in Saskatoon, Saskatchewan and worked in road construction.
After retiring from road working at the age of sixty-six, his son, Jim Shockey, invited Hal to work for his outfitting show and company. From that point, Hal Shockey became an important character on his son's hit hunting TV show on Outdoor Channel, which airs in America and Wild TV in Canada.

Hal Shockey married Lil Shockey. He is related to Jim Shockey, Eva Shockey, Len Johann, and Branlin Shockey.

Death
Hal Shockey died on October 1, 2013 at the age of 86 of natural causes.

References

Canadian hunters
1927 births
2013 deaths